Urinary kallikrein may refer to:

 Plasma kallikrein, an enzyme
 Renal tissue kallikrein, an enzyme